The Women's 50 metre rifle prone singles event took place at 12 October 2010 at the CRPF Campus.

Results

External links
Report

Shooting at the 2010 Commonwealth Games
Comm